Statius is a Latin or Italic personal name, or praenomen, which gave rise to a patronymic surname.  Prominent individuals with this name include:

 Statius Albius Oppianicus, discussed by Marcus Tullius Cicero in his oration, Pro Cluentio.
 Caecilius Statius (c. 220 - c. 166 BC), early Roman comic poet.
 Publius Papinius Statius, a Roman poet of the Silver Age of Latin literature.
 Achilles Statius, a 16th-century Portuguese humanist and writer.
 Philipp Ludwig Statius Müller, an 18th-century German zoologist.
 Wim Statius Muller, a contemporary Antillean composer and pianist.

Statius may also refer to:

 Sint Eustatius, an island in the Caribbean

See also 

 Statius (praenomen)